James Allen (1830 – 1906), known as the "Snowdrop King," was a nurseryman and galanthophile of Shepton Mallet, Somerset, United Kingdom, known principally for his hybridizations of snowdrops and anemones. He is credited with the discovery of Galanthus ×allenii (1883).

Allen spotted Galanthus ×allenii amongst a batch of bulbs that had been imported from the Caucasus. Originally classed as a species, this strongly scented snowdrop is now thought to be a hybrid. It is described as being "intermediate in appearance between G. caucasicus [ now G. elwesii var. monostictus ] and G. ikariae", and may be a natural hybrid between those species.

References

Further sources

 Bulbs, Roger Phillips and Martin Rix, Pan Macmillan (1989) 
 RHS Plant Finder 2008–2009, Tony Lord (editor), Dorling Kindersley (2008)

External links
Shepton Snowdrop Festival

1830 births
1906 deaths
English horticulturists
People from Shepton Mallet
Nurserymen